Chahar Rah-e Ali Tayyeb (also Romanized as Chahār Rāh-e ʿAlī Ţayyeb; also known as Chahār Rāh-e Āl-e Ţayyeb) is a village in Olya Tayeb Rural District, in the Central District of Landeh County, Kohgiluyeh and Boyer-Ahmad Province, Iran. At the 2006 census, its population was 260, in 56 families.

References 

Populated places in Landeh County